Lutheran High School South (LHSS) is a private Lutheran co-educational school located in Affton, an unincorporated area in St. Louis County, Missouri, in the United States. Established in 1957, the school is affiliated with the Lutheran Church–Missouri Synod.

The school serves approximately 500 students in grades 9 through 12 who live in the St. Louis, Missouri area. Lutheran South, along with Lutheran High School North, belong to the Lutheran High School Association of St. Louis. LHSS is accredited by AdvancED.

Overview 
Students at Lutheran South can earn college credit through courses offering either dual credit through Saint Louis University or the opportunity to take Advanced Placement exams. Lutheran South's college preparatory curriculum results in 97% of graduates attending colleges and/or universities. In addition to a wide variety of elective courses, students take theology classes each year. Daily worship experiences and service opportunities are also part of the Lutheran South experience.

In the 2019-2020 school year, Lutheran South had 419 students served by over 50 professional staff, including teachers, counselors and administrators. Over 80% of the faculty hold a master's degree or higher. LHSS has a diverse co-curricular program, including 39 athletic, cheerleading and dance squads; intramural activities; drama presentations; the Messengers, a worship-through-drama group; an mock trial team; academic games team; and a student council. Lutheran South is particularly known for its music program. Two choral music groups, Concert Choir and Lancer Singers. Lancer Singers is audition-based. The three instrumental groups are Concert Band, Wind Symphony and the Jazz Band. The latter two are audition-based. Lutheran South's music department utilizes the talents of nearly one-third of the student body.

Notable alumni
 Jim Mayer, singer-songwriter, longtime guitar bassist for Jimmy Buffett’s Coral Reefer Band
Leketor Member-Meneh, volleyball player

References

External links
 Lutheran High School South website

High schools in St. Louis County, Missouri
Private schools in St. Louis County, Missouri
Lutheran schools in Missouri
Private high schools in Missouri
Secondary schools affiliated with the Lutheran Church–Missouri Synod
1957 establishments in Missouri
Educational institutions established in 1957